Rips is the debut studio album by American indie rock band Ex Hex. It was released on October 7, 2014 by Merge Records.

Critical reception

Rips holds a score of 84 out of 100 on the review aggregate site Metacritic, indicating "universal acclaim". Pitchfork writer Aaron Leitko gave Rips a "Best New Music" designation and remarked that the album "mostly finds the band walking away from Timony's established voice and pushing toward something more direct and energetic—embracing the past, but also blowing things up and starting again." Heather Phares of AllMusic wrote that Rips "mixes simple pleasures and complicated ones into a completely life-affirming debut", while Laura Snapes of NME called the album "a reminder of rock’s glorious communal potential".

NME named Rips the tenth best album of 2014. It also placed at number 11 on The Village Voices Pazz & Jop year-end critics' poll.

Year-end lists

Track listing

Personnel

Ex Hex
 Laura Harris – drums
 Mary Timony – guitar, vocals
 Betsy Wright – bass guitar

Additional personnel
 Mitch Easter – engineering
 Bobby Harlow – mixing
 Dennis Kane – tracking
 Johann Kauth – artwork, layout
 Jeff Lipton – mastering
 Maria Rice – mastering assistant
 Jonah Takagi – production, tracking, photography
 Missy Thangs – recording assistant

Charts

References

2014 debut albums
Ex Hex (band) albums
Merge Records albums